Salticus palpalis is a species of spider from the family Salticidae.

Description
The species are black coloured, with white stripes on the back. The males have brownish back, while females are completely black.

References

Salticidae
Spiders of the United States
Spiders described in 1904
Taxa named by Nathan Banks